A tanker (or tank ship or tankship) is a ship designed to transport or store liquids or gases in bulk.  Major types of tankship include the oil tanker, the chemical tanker, and gas carrier. Tankers also carry commodities such as vegetable oils, molasses and wine. In the United States Navy and Military Sealift Command, a tanker used to refuel other ships is called an oiler (or replenishment oiler if it can also supply dry stores) but many other navies use the terms tanker and replenishment tanker. Tankers were first developed in the late 19th century as iron and steel hulls and pumping systems were developed. As of 2005, there were just over 4,000 tankers and supertankers  or greater operating worldwide.

Description 
Tankers can range in size of capacity from several hundred tons, which includes vessels for servicing small harbours and coastal settlements, to several hundred thousand tons, for long-range haulage. Besides ocean- or seagoing tankers there are also specialized inland-waterway tankers which operate on rivers and canals with an average cargo capacity up to some thousand tons. A wide range of products are carried by tankers, including:
 Hydrocarbon products such as oil, liquefied petroleum gas (LPG), and liquefied natural gas (LNG)
 Chemicals, such as ammonia, chlorine, and styrene monomer
 Fresh water
 Wine
 Molasses
 Citrus juice

Tankers are a relatively new concept, dating from the later years of the 19th century. Before this, technology had simply not supported the idea of carrying bulk liquids. The market was also not geared towards transporting or selling cargo in bulk, therefore most ships carried a wide range of different products in different holds and traded outside fixed routes. Liquids were usually loaded in casks—hence the term "tonnage", which refers to the volume of the holds in terms of how many tuns or casks of wine could be carried. Even potable water, vital for the survival of the crew, was stowed in casks. Carrying bulk liquids in earlier ships posed several problems:
The holds: on timber ships the holds were not sufficiently water, oil or air-tight to prevent a liquid cargo from spoiling or leaking. The development of iron and steel hulls solved this problem.
Loading and discharging: Bulk liquids must be pumped - the development of efficient pumps and piping systems was vital to the development of the tanker. Steam engines were developed as prime-movers for early pumping systems. Dedicated cargo handling facilities were now required ashore too - as was a market for receiving a product in that quantity. Casks could be unloaded using ordinary cranes, and the awkward nature of the casks meant that the volume of liquid was always relatively small - therefore keeping the market more stable.
Free surface effect: a large body of liquid carried aboard a ship will affect the ship's stability, particularly when the liquid is flowing around the hold or tank in response to the ship's movements. The effect was negligible in casks, but could cause capsizing if the tank extended the width of the ship; a problem solved by extensive subdivision of the tanks.

Tankers were first used by the oil industry to transfer refined fuel in bulk from refineries to customers. This would then be stored in large tanks ashore, and subdivided for delivery to individual locations. The use of tankers caught on because other liquids were also cheaper to transport in bulk, store in dedicated terminals, then subdivide. Even the Guinness brewery used tankers to transport the stout across the Irish Sea.

Different products require different handling and transport, with specialised variants such as "chemical tankers", "oil tankers", and "LNG carriers" developed to handle dangerous chemicals, oil and oil-derived products, and liquefied natural gas respectively. These broad variants may be further differentiated with respect to ability to carry only a single product or simultaneously transport mixed cargoes such as several different chemicals or refined petroleum products. Among oil tankers, supertankers are designed for transporting oil around the Horn of Africa from the Middle East. Supertankers are one of the three preferred methods for transporting large quantities of oil, along with pipeline transport and rail.

Tighter regulation means that tankers now cause fewer environmental disasters resulting from oil spills than in the 1970s. Oil spills from tankers amounted to around 1,000 tonnes in 2020 from three incidents (an all-time low), down from 636,000 tonnes from 92 incidents in 1979 - a fall of 99.8%.

Design considerations
Many modern tankers are designed for a specific cargo and a specific route. Draft is typically limited by the depth of water in loading and unloading harbors; and may be limited by the depth of straits or canals along the preferred shipping route. Cargoes with high vapor pressure at ambient temperatures may require pressurized tanks or vapor recovery systems. Tank heaters may be required to maintain heavy crude oil, residual fuel, asphalt, wax, or molasses in a fluid state for offloading.

Tanker capacity
Tankers used for liquid fuels are classified according to their capacity.

In 1954, Shell Oil developed the average freight rate assessment (AFRA) system, which classifies tankers of different sizes. To make it an independent instrument, Shell consulted the London Tanker Brokers’ Panel (LTBP). The ships became larger during the 1970s, and the list was extended, where the tons are metric tonnes:
 Under : Extra small tanker
10,000–: Small tanker
25,000–34,999 DWT: Intermediate tanker
35,000–44,999 DWT: Medium Range 1 (MR1)
45,000–: Medium Range 2 (MR2)
55,000–:  Long Range 1 (LR1)
80,000–: Long Range 2 (LR2)
160,000–: Very Large Crude Carrier (VLCC)
320,000–: Ultra Large Crude Carrier (ULCC)
550,000-: Hyper Large Crude Carrier (HLCC)
900,000-: Mega Crude Carrier (MCC)
 Over : Giga Crude Carrier (GCC)
 Very Large Crude Carrier size range

Fleets of the world

 Flag states
Panama is the leading flag state of tankers, with 592 registered ships. Five other flag states have more than two hundred registered tankers: Liberia (520), The Marshall Islands (323), Greece (233), Singapore (274) and The Bahamas (215). These flag states are also the top six in terms of fleet size in terms of deadweight tonnage.

 Largest fleets
Greece, Japan, and the United States are the top three owners of tankers (including those owned but registered to other nations), with 733, 394, and 311 vessels respectively.  These three nations account for 1,438 vessels or over 36% of the world's fleet.

 Builders
Asian companies dominate the construction of tankers.  Of the world's 4,024 tankers, 2,822 (over 70%) were built in South Korea, Japan and China.

Further reading
Petroleum Tables, a book by William Davies, an early tanker captain, was published in 1903, although Davies had printed earlier versions himself. Including his calculations on the expansion and contraction of bulk oil, and other information for tanker officers, it went into multiple editions, and in 1915 The Petroleum World commented that it was "the standard book for computations and conversions."

See also

Hydrogen tanker
List of gas carriers
List of tankers
T1 tanker
T2 tanker
T3 Tanker

Notes

References

External links

 ship-photos.de: Private homepage of categorized ship photos including tankers of all kinds

Ship types